Steromphala umbilicaris is a species of sea snail, a marine gastropod mollusk in the family Trochidae, the top snails.

Description
The size of an adult shell varies between 10 mm and 25 mm. The conical shell is umbilicate. Its color is cinereous, reddish, or purplish-brown, obscurely clouded, dotted or flamed with white The conical spire is acuminate. There are about seven whorls, slightly convex, spirally striate, microscopically obliquely striate. The lirae are generally subobsolete on the last whorl. The periphery is obtusely angulate. The aperture is rather small, oblique, rounded-quadrate, angled at the base and smooth within. The columella is arcuate above, straightened below.

Distribution
This marine species occurs in European waters and in the Mediterranean Sea.

References

 Gofas, S.; Le Renard, J.; Bouchet, P. (2001). Mollusca, in: Costello, M.J. et al. (Ed.) (2001). European register of marine species: a check-list of the marine species in Europe and a bibliography of guides to their identification. Collection Patrimoines Naturels, 50: pp. 180–213

External links
 
 Linnaeus, C. (1758). Systema Naturae per regna tria naturae, secundum classes, ordines, genera, species, cum characteribus, differentiis, synonymis, locis. Editio decima, reformata [10th revised edition, vol. 1: 824 pp. Laurentius Salvius: Holmiae]
 Risso, A. (1826-1827). Histoire naturelle des principales productions de l'Europe Méridionale et particulièrement de celles des environs de Nice et des Alpes Maritimes. Paris, Levrault:. . 3(XVI): 1-480, 14 pls
 Gmelin J.F. (1791). Vermes. In: Gmelin J.F. (Ed.) Caroli a Linnaei Systema Naturae per Regna Tria Naturae, Ed. 13. Tome 1(6). G.E. Beer, Lipsiae [Leipzig. pp. 3021-3910]
 Monterosato, T. A. (1880). Notizie intorno ad alcune conchiglie delle coste d'Africa. Bullettino della Società Malacologica Italiana, Pisa. 5: 213-233
 Bucquoy E., Dautzenberg P. & Dollfus G. (1882-1886). Les mollusques marins du Roussillon. Tome Ier. Gastropodes. Paris: Baillière & fils. 570 pp., 66 pls
 Monterosato T. A. (di). (1888-1889). Molluschi del Porto di Palermo. Specie e varietà. Bullettino della Società Malacologica Italiana. 13: 161-180
  Pallary P. (1912). Catalogue des mollusques du littoral méditerranéen de l'Egypte. Mémoires de l'Institut d'Egypte, 7(3): 69-207, pl. 15-18
 Affenzeller S., Haar N. & Steiner G. (2017). Revision of the genus complex Gibbula: an integrative approach to delineating the Eastern Mediterranean genera Gibbula Risso, 1826, Steromphala Gray, 1847, and Phorcus Risso, 1826 using DNA-barcoding and geometric morphometrics (Vetigastropoda, Trochoidea). Organisms Diversity & Evolution. 17(4): 789-812

umbilicaris
Gastropods described in 1758
Taxa named by Carl Linnaeus